Arawan (also Arahuan, Arauan, Arawán, Arawa, Arauán) is a family of languages spoken in western Brazil (Amazonas, Acre) and Peru (Ucayali).

Language contact
Jolkesky (2016) notes that there are lexical similarities with the Chapakura-Wañam, Jivaro, Kwaza, Maku, Mura-Matanawi, Taruma, Yanomami, Arawak, Nadahup, Puinave-Kak, and Tupi language families due to contact.

Family division
Arauan consists of half a dozen languages:

 Arawá †
 Kulina
 Deni
 Jamamadi
 Paumari
 Suruwahá

Jolkesky (2016)
Internal classification by Jolkesky (2016):

(† = extinct)

Arawa
Suruwaha
Madi-Deni-Paumari
Paumari
Deni, Kulina
Madi-Arawa
Arawa †
Madi: Banawa; Jamamadi; Jarawara

Dienst (2010)
Internal classification by Dienst (2010):

Arawan
Arawa †
Paumari
Suruwahá
Madi-Madihá
Madi
Eastern Jamamadi
Banawá
Jarawara
Madihá
Kulina
Western Jamamadi
Deni

Mason (1950)
Arauá internal classification by Mason (1950):

Arauá
Culino
Culina
Curia
Curiana
Culiña
Pama
Pama
Pamana
Yamamadí
Yamamadí: Capaná, Capinamari, Colo
Purupurú: Paumarí (Pammarí)
Yuberi
Madihá
Sewacu
Sipó

Other varieties

 Himarimã - presumed language spoken by the Himarimã people along the Piranha River between the Juruá River and Purus River. Per Suruwahá and Banawá testimonies, it is believed to be Arawan.

Unattested varieties listed by Loukotka (1968):

Purupurú - extinct language spoken in the same region on the lower course of the Purus River. (Unattested)
Uainamari / Wainamarí - extinct language spoken on the Inauini River, a tributary of the upper Purus River. (Unattested)
Uatanari / Watanarí - once spoken on the Ituxi River and Sepatini River in the same region; now perhaps extinct. (Unattested)
Sewacu - once spoken on the Pauini River, now on the left bank of the Purus River on the opposite side of the mouth of the Sepatini River. (Unattested)
Pamana - once spoken on the Ituxi River and Mucuim River near Lake Agaam, the same region; now probably extinct. (Unattested)
Amamati - extinct language once spoken on the Mucuim River north of the Pamana tribe. (Unattested)
Yuberí / Xubiri - once spoken on the middle course of the Purus River on the opposite side of the mouth of the Mamoriá River and around Lake Abunini, now on the lower course of the Tapauá River, the same region. (Unattested)
Sipó / Cipo - extinct language once spoken north of the Yuberi tribe on the Tapaua River. (Unattested)
Curina / Kurina / Kólö - language spoken in two regions; first, on the right bank of the Juruá River, along the Marari River and on the upper course of the Tapauá River; second, on the Eiru River and Gregório River and on the left bank of the Muru River, territory of Acre, Brazil.
Madiha - spoken on the Eiru River near Bom Jardim, Amazonas.
Catiana - extinct language once spoken on the Iaco River, Acre. (Unattested)

Vocabulary
Loukotka (1968) lists the following basic vocabulary items.

{| class="wikitable sortable"
! gloss !! Arauá !! Yamamadi !! Paumari !! Curina !! Madiha
|-
! one
| warihí || itarini || huarani || ahã || ahã
|-
! two
| fanihi || mushamu || faumini ||  || pamawi
|-
! three
| arisafaha || uharini || harabakudzeki ||  || nawi
|-
! head
|  || ä-tati || dadií || tazi-ama || i-tati
|-
! eye
|  || ä-narobõ || murubui || eribu || waribu
|-
! hand
| u-safá || ä-dzäfä || dzẽi || iyepe || zepe
|-
! water
| pahá || pãhã || pãhá || patsu || patsu
|-
! fire
| sihú || yefu || sidzyú || dipu || zipu
|-
! sun
| mahí || mahi || kasiri || maxi || maxi
|-
! maize
|  || kemi || yoruá || tapá || tapa
|-
! tapir
| awí || aui || dama || auhi || awi
|-
! house
| zamí || huda || gurã || uza || uáza
|}

Proto-language
Below are selected Proto-Arawá (Proto-Arawan) reconstructions of flora and fauna names by Dixon (2004):

Flora
{| class="wikitable"
! Proto-Arawá !! English gloss !! Portuguese gloss
|-
| *biha || yam sp. || carai
|-
| *boba || palm sp. || paxiúba
|-
| *bodi || fruit sp. || bacuri
|-
| *'boko || tree sp. || imbaúba
|-
| *doni || tonka bean || cumaru
|-
| *hawa || patauá palm || patauá
|-
| *imi || ingá (tree and edible fruit) || ingá
|-
| *jani || palm sp. || paxiubinha
|-
| *jawana || palm sp. || murumuru
|-
| *jawida || peach palm || 
|-
| *kahami || palm sp. || urucuri
|-
| *majo || tree sp. || pajurá
|-
| *nabohi || palm sp. || paxiúba-barriguda
|-
| *ora || genipap || jenipapo
|-
| *para'i || assai palm || 
|-
| *sanaro || passion fruit || maracujá
|-
| *tamajara || matamatá tree, envira tree || matamatá, envira
|-
| *tamino || jackfruit tree || 
|-
| *waishowa || several trees of genus Lucuma || abiurana
|-
| *wasina, *wasini || kapok ceibe tree || samaúma, Ceiba pentandra
|-
| *wekhe'i || rubber tree || Hevea brasiliensis
|-
| *xidepe || tree sp.; red paint made from fruit || urucu, Bixa orellana
|}

Fauna

Mammals
{| class="wikitable"
! Proto-Arawá !! English gloss !! Portuguese gloss
|-
| *gapha || woolly monkey || 
|-
| *hijama || white-lipped peccary || 
|-
| *hojawa || giant anteater || 
|-
| *ja'o || sloth sp. || 
|-
| *jajiko || howler monkey || 
|-
| *jotomi || coati || quati
|-
| *jowi(hi) || capuchin monkey || 
|-
| *kawina || howler monkey || 
|-
| *kiriwe || three-toed sloth || 
|-
| *kishi- || armadillo || tatu
|-
| *kiso || capuchin monkey || 
|-
| *kosikosi || kinkajou, night monkey || jupará
|-
| *mase || bat || 
|-
| *modo || anteater || tamanduá
|-
| *mowi || night monkey || 
|-
| *pishi || squirrel monkey; marmoset (small monkey) || macaco-de-cheiro, Saimiri sciureus
|-
| *shawa(ri) || weasel sp. || irara
|-
| *shinama || agouti || cutia
|-
| *tamakori || monkey sp. || macaco parauaçu, Pithecia monachus
|}

Birds
{| class="wikitable"
! Proto-Arawá !! English gloss !! Portuguese gloss
|-
| *ama'ahawa || socó heron || socó
|-
| *amasawari || socozinho heron || socozinho
|-
| *dapo || guan (bird sp.) || 
|-
| *DiroDiro || kingfisher || 
|-
| *hiriti || motmot bird || 
|-
| *jakhi || toucan (Ramphastos) || 
|-
| *kamowa || dove sp. || juriti, rolinha
|-
| *kawashiro || oriole || 
|-
| *komi || trogon (bird sp.) || 
|-
| *khere || kingfisher || ariramba
|-
| *okoko || pigeon, dove sp. || juriti
|-
| *shabiria || eagle-hawk || Harpia harpyja
|-
| *tano || pied-crested oropendola (type of oriole) || japu
|-
| *tawikhoro(ro) || black-fronted nunbird || bico-de-brasa
|-
| *tobejaro, *tobejero) || nighthawk || bacurau
|-
| *wara- || chachalaca (bird) || aracuã
|}

Fish
{| class="wikitable"
! Proto-Arawá !! English gloss !! Portuguese gloss
|-
| *aba majaro || arowana (fish sp.) || aruanã
|-
| *'awida || piau sp. (fish) || piau
|-
| *bahama || surubim (large fish) || surubim
|-
| *basani || pacu (fish sp.) || pacu
|-
| *bidama || catfish sp. || mandi
|-
| *dawi || big leaf calathea (fish sp.) || 
|-
| *kosop(h)a || tucunaré (fish sp.) || tucunaré
|-
| *khorobo || fish sp. || jeju?
|-
| *moro || fish sp. (cangati sp.; large catfish) || cangati; jai preto, Paulicea luetkeni
|-
| *otawi || cará (fish sp.) || cará
|-
| *siraba || fish sp. || cangati, cará, acará
|-
| *shako || lungfish || traíra
|}

Other animals
{| class="wikitable"
! Proto-Arawá !! English gloss !! Portuguese gloss
|-
| *kowasa || tortoise || 
|-
| *shire || turtle || tartaruga
|-
| *bitha || large mosquito || carapanã
|-
| *'Diriri || cicada || 
|-
| *jimo, *jomo || ant sp. || tocandira
|-
| *karajati || biting fly || mutuca
|-
| *waharo || large mosquito || carapanã
|}

Bibliography
 Buller, Barbara; Buller, Ernest; & Everett, Daniel L. (1993).  Stress placement, syllable structure, and minimality in Banawá. International Journal of American Linguistics, 59 (1), 280-293.
 Campbell, Lyle. (1997). American Indian languages: The historical linguistics of Native America. New York: Oxford University Press. .
 Dixon, R. M. W. (2001). Internal reconstruction of tense-modal suffixes in Jarawara. Diachronica, 18, 3-30.
 Dixon, R. M. W. (2004a). The Jarawara language of southern Amazonia. Oxford: Oxford University Press. .
 Dixon, R. M. W. (2004b). Proto-Arawá phonology. Anthropological Linguistics, 46, 1–83.
 Kaufman, Terrence. (1990). Language history in South America: What we know and how to know more. In D. L. Payne (Ed.), Amazonian linguistics: Studies in lowland South American languages (pp. 13–67). Austin: University of Texas Press. .
 Kaufman, Terrence. (1994). The native languages of South America. In C. Mosley & R. E. Asher (Eds.), Atlas of the world's languages (pp. 46–76). London: Routledge.

Lexicons
Chapman, Sh.; Salzer, M. (1998). Dicionário bilíngue nas línguas paumarí e portuguesa. Porto Velho: Sociedade Internacional de Lingüística.
Koop, G.; Koop, L. (1985). Dicionário Dení Português (com introdução gramatical). Porto Velho: Summer Institute of Linguistics.
Ssila, A. O.; Monserrat, R. M. F. (1984). Dicionário kulina-português e português-kulina (dialeto do Igarapé do Anjo). Acre: Conselho Indigenista Missionário.
Suzuki, M. (2002). Dicionário suruwahá-português and vocabulário português- suruwahá. Hawaii: University of the Nations.
Vogel, A. R. (2005). Dicionário Jarawara - Português. Cuiabá: SIL.

References

External links

 Sub-tronco Arawán

 
Language families
Indigenous languages of Western Amazonia
Languages of Brazil
Languages of Peru
Macro-Arawakan languages